Club Deportivo Rincón is a Spanish football team based in Rincón de la Victoria, Málaga, in the autonomous community of Andalusia. Founded in 1964, it currently plays in División de Honor Andaluza – Group 2, holding home matches at Estadio Francisco Romero, with a capacity of 3,000 spectators.

Season to season

 4 seasons in Tercera División

References

External links
BDFutbol team profile
Soccerway team profile

1964 establishments in Spain
Association football clubs established in 1964
Football clubs in Andalusia